Baldomero Amarilla (24 August 1935 – 4 February 2014) was a Paraguayan footballer. He played in six matches for the Paraguay national football team from 1962 to 1963. He was also part of Paraguay's squad for the 1963 South American Championship.

References

External links
 

1935 births
2014 deaths
Paraguayan footballers
Paraguay international footballers
Association football defenders
People from Encarnación, Paraguay